Róbert Fekete is a Hungarian football player.

References

1971 births
Living people
People from Kiskunfélegyháza
Hungarian footballers
Debreceni VSC players
AEP Paphos FC players
Cypriot First Division players
Expatriate footballers in Cyprus
Association football goalkeepers
Sportspeople from Bács-Kiskun County